Solveig Augusta Maria Sundborg (14 March 1910 – 22 July 2002) was a Danish film actress. She appeared in 23 films between 1932 and 1994.

She was born in Copenhagen, Denmark and died in Denmark.

Selected filmography
 Han, hun og Hamlet (1932)
 Det støver stadig (1962)
 Love Thy Neighbour (1967)
 The Olsen Gang (1968)
 Hooray for the Blue Hussars (1970)
 The Olsen Gang's Big Score (1972)

References

External links

1910 births
2002 deaths
Danish film actresses
Actresses from Copenhagen
20th-century Danish actresses